Xiong E (died 791 BC) was from 799 to 791 BC the monarch of the state of Chu during the Western Zhou Dynasty of ancient China.  Like other early Chu rulers, he held the hereditary noble rank of viscount first granted to his ancestor Xiong Yi by King Cheng of Zhou.

Xiong E succeeded his father Xiong Xun, who died in 800 BC. He died after nine years of reign and was succeeded by his son Ruo'ao.

References

Monarchs of Chu (state)
8th-century BC Chinese monarchs
791 BC deaths
Year of birth unknown